Marco Khan (born Marco Khanlian; March 27, 1961) is an Iranian-born Armenian-American actor and stunt performer. He has appeared in numerous well-known film and television series like Pirates of the Caribbean: Dead Man's Chest, Iron Man, and 10,000 BC, as well as numerous independent and short films.

Biography 
Khan was born in Tehran, Iran to Armenian parents; the son of Anna (née Karamian) and Levon Khanlian. His father was born in Lebanon but was raised in Iran, where he met Khan's mother, whose parents were from Georgia and she was born in Babol, Iran. Marco and younger brother, Aleko, left Iran at age 11 in pursuit of higher education. Schooled in a Mekhitarist school, the Moorat Raphaelian, in Venice, Italy, and then in Catalina, California – Marco now calls Los Angeles home. 

At age 17, Marco picked up English as his 4th language and assumed the responsibility as the caretaker for his entire family. He operated a series of restaurants (Marco's Pizzeria) for 12 years to support his family. He has a son too, that he has raised on his own. Marco had a short experience before getting into acting in Semi-Pro soccer and professional wrestling nicknamed "The Persian Terror".

Filmography

Films

Television

Video games

References

Notes

External links

1979 births
Living people
American people of Armenian descent
American male film actors
American male television actors
American male voice actors
American stunt performers
Iranian emigrants to the United States
Iranian expatriates in Italy
Iranian male film actors
Iranian male television actors
Iranian male voice actors
Iranian stunt performers
Iranian people of Armenian descent
Male actors from California
Male actors from Tehran
Male video game actors